Arutla Kamala Devi is an indian politician, freedom fighter and leader of Communist Party of India. She represented Alair constituency from 1952 to 1967 with 3 consecutive terms. She was among the leaders and fighters in the armed freedom struggle against the rule of Nizam (the last ruler of the erstwhile princely state of Hyderabad). The communists joined with the poor peasants in the present day Telangana state during the 1940s to overthrow the Nizam's feudal regime. It was a sub movement in the larger independence struggle of India. She is the first woman opposition leader in India.

References

Female politicians of the Communist Party of India
Telangana Rebellion
Telugu people
People from Nalgonda district
Andhra Pradesh MLAs 1962–1967
Communist Party of India politicians from Telangana
Madras MLAs 1952–1957
Madras MLAs 1957–1962
1920 births
2001 deaths
Women members of the Tamil Nadu Legislative Assembly